Paul Belaski is an American politician who served in the Vermont House of Representatives from 2017 to 2019.

References

Living people
21st-century American politicians
Members of the Vermont House of Representatives
Harvard University alumni
University of Pennsylvania alumni
Year of birth missing (living people)